Claudio Bosia (born 17 April 1983) is an Italian freestyle skier. He competed in the men's moguls event at the 2006 Winter Olympics.

References

External links
 

1983 births
Living people
Italian male freestyle skiers
Olympic freestyle skiers of Italy
Freestyle skiers at the 2006 Winter Olympics
People from Sorengo